The Pearl Saga is the name of an incomplete series of science fiction / fantasy novels by Eric Van Lustbader. The series centers on Kundala, a planet conquered by the V'ornn, a race of aristocratic, militaristic humanoids; themselves ruled by the Gyrgon, a cabal of mysterious androgynous technomages. The main character is Riane, a prophesied redeemer known as the Dar Sala-at, born at both ends of the cosmos.

Characters 
 Annon Ashera - outcast V'ornn
 Riane - amnesiac girl
 Lady Giyan - lover of Annon's father
 Miina - creator Goddess
 Thigpen - a Rappa, a talking, six-limbed creature
 Eleana - woman loved by both Annon and Riane
 Kurgan, V'ornn rapist of Eleana, sire of her child
 Marethyn Stogggul, Kurgan's defiant sister, an artist who joins the Kundalan resistance
 Sornnn SaTrryn, chief trader and Marethyn's lover
 Krystren, a Sarakkon woman from the mysterious southern continent
 Rekkk Hacilar, former Pack-Commander, now Transcended (part Gyrgon)
 Nith Sahor, renegade Gyrgon
 Minnum, curator of the Museum of False Memory

Kundala
Kundala is a planet with five moons and nine seas.

Five Sacred Dragons
The five dragons created Kundala under the direction of the Goddess Miia.
 Eshir - air / Forgiveness
 Gom - earth / Renewal
 Yig - fire / Power
 Seelin - water / Transformation
 Paow - wood / Vision

Daemons
The daemons constructed and shaped Kundala. When they finished, they did not want to leave and were banished to the Abyss, a sorcerous void.
 Pyphoros
 Horolaggia
 Myggorra
 Sepseriis
 Tzelos

Cultures

Kundalan
Kundalan culture is based roughly around the worship of the Great Goddess Miina, creator of Kundala. Kundalan society was once patriarchal, but is currently matriarchal. Worship is conducted in Abbeys, by the Ramahan. Kundalans practice at least two different kinds of sorcery, Osoru and Kyofu.

They speak one common language, with two older languages - the Old Tongue and Venca, the language of sorcery - being less common. The Venca language has 777 letters, ten times that of the Old Tongue.

V'ornn
The V'ornn are a nomadic, space-faring race, ostensibly searching for a new homeworld. V'ornn culture is centered on castes. They do not (currently) worship anything. The Mesagggun previously worshiped the War God Enlil, now dead.

The Greater Castes
 Bashkir - Merchants
 Gyorgan - Technomages
 Genomatekks - Physicians

The Lesser Castes
 Khagggun - Warriors
 Mesagggun - Engineers
 Tuskugggun - Females (as artists, musicians, artificers, prostitutes(Looorm)  )
 Deirus - Physicians (morticians and psychotherapists)

The V'ornn lack hair entirely and have pale yellow skin. V'ornns view all other species as soulless animals. Despite different origins, they can interbreed with Kundalans.

Druuge
A nomadic people that live in the Great Voorg, a desert. They speak Venca. Some aspects of Druuge cosmology parallels V'ornn mythology.

Sarakkon
Inhabitants of the radioactive Southern Continent. They worship an androgynous being, Abrasea.

Centophennni
The only race to have stood against the V'ornn, the one thing they fear. They inflicted a punishing defeat upon the V'ornn fleet at Hellespennn 250 years previously, in revenge for the V'ornn invasion of their world 300 years before that. Their weapons use a Goron particle beam.

Items
The novels revolve around these items and the quest to find them.

 Ring of Five Dragons - Ring carved from red jade. Enables the opening of The Storehouse Door.
 The Pearl - Item formed during the creation of Kundala.
 The Veil of a Thousand Tears - Transformed outer shell of The Pearl.
 Nine Banestones

Bibliography

Incompleteness
Van Lustbader has stated that, due to the popularity of the Bourne series, The Pearl Saga was put on hold. He says the series is expected to run to six or seven novels.

References

External links 
 Eric Van Lustbader - Fantasy
 Review at Green Man Review
 The Pearl at Macmillan
 

Science fiction book series
Novels by Eric Van Lustbader
Tor Books books
Science fantasy novels
Novels about extraterrestrial life